Pogonocherus decoratus is a species of beetle in the family Cerambycidae. It was described by Léon Fairmaire in 1855. It has a very wide distribution throughout Europe. It feeds on Pinus sylvestris.

References

Pogonocherini
Beetles described in 1855